Nisia is a genus of planthoppers in the family Meenoplidae. Species in the genus are known from Africa, Asia and Australia. Most species are associated with monocotyledonous host plants, particularly sedges in the family Cyperaceae. 

Species in the genus include:
 Nisia nervosa (Motchulsky 1863) 
 Nisia atrovenosa (Lethierry, 1888)
 Nisia psylla Bierman, 1910
 Nisia fuliginosa Lianfang & Chunlin, 1985
 Nisia carolinensis Fennah, 1971

A cave dwelling species, Nisia subfogo, has been described from Cape Verde. Two species formerly placed in this genus are now placed in the genus Anigrus.
 Nisia nitida Bierman, 1910
 Nisia campbelli Distant, 1916

References 

Hemiptera genera
Meenoplidae